Pernem or Pedne (pronounced ) is a town and a municipal council in North Goa district in the Indian state of Goa. It is the capital of the Pernem Sub-District

Geography

Pernem  is one of the twelve sub-districts of Goa. Pernem  sub-district consists of twenty village panchayats and one municipality (Pernem  city). Pernem  sub-district is surrounded by Vengurla and Sawantwadi sub-districts of Sindhudurga to the north, Dodamarg sub-district of Sindhudurga to the east, Bardez and Bicholim to the south and the Arabian Sea to the west.

Villages and towns in the area include Agarvado, Alorna, Amberem, Arambol, Cansarvornem, Casnem, Chandel, Chopdem, Corgao, Dargalim, Ibrampur, Mandrem, Morjim, Mopa, Ozorim, Paliem, Parcem, Pernem, Poroscodem, Querim, Tamboxem, Tiracol, Torxem, Tuem, Uguem, Varconda and Virnora.

Pernem  has two waterfalls, in Mauli Temple area at Sarmale and at Mulvir Temple area at Malpe.

Demographics

As of the 2011 Census of India, Pernem Municipal Council had a population of 5,021 of which 2,557 are male and 2,464 are female. Children of age 0–6 numbered 402, 8.01% of the total. The female sex ratio is of 964 against state average of 973. The child sex ratio is around 836 compared to Goa state average of 942. The literacy rate is 91.19%, higher than the state average of 88.70%. The male literacy is around 94.65% while female literacy rate is 87.64%.

Religion

Igreja de São José
A chapel was built in 1852 by the Portuguese after their successful Nova Conquistador campaign. It was elevated into a Parish on 2 January 1855. St. Joseph Church was rebuilt in 1864 and renovated in 2002. The Parish has 5 substations constituted of 11 small Christian communities. Fr. Paulo Dias is the Parish Priest.

Hindu Festivals
Pernem  is famous for Dussehra. The festival spans 5 days, ending on Kojagiri Pournima. On the day of Kojagiri Pournima one of Goa's biggest feasts is organised. Temples include Adisthan Mangar, Bhagawati, Rawalnath, Sateri, Dwarpal, Mauli, Gautameshwar, Narayan, Mulvir, Maruti and Shri somnath.

Economy
There is no major source of income in the sub-district. The sub-district market is not large. Most of the people depend on other regions for employment. Pernem hosts around 300 to 400 small and medium enterprises. The Thursday weekly market is the second largest in North Goa.

Government and politics
Pernem is part of Pernem (Goa Assembly constituency) and North Goa (Lok Sabha constituency).

Education
The four high schools are Vikas High School, Viscount of Pernem High School, Shree Bhagwati and St. Joseph. Higher education is pursued at Govt Higher Secondary of Commerce, Arts, Science & Vocational studies, Govt College Sohirobanath Ambiye college of arts and commerce. One ITI. For higher education in Science, Engineering and Medicine students go to other cities.

Medical facility 
There is only one hospital in Pernem that is Community Health Centre Pernem.

Transport  
Pernem  is well connected, by road and the Konkan Railway. Pernem railway station is the first railway station in Goa for inbound trains from Mumbai. Mandovi Express, Konkan Kanya Express and Goa Sampark Kranti Express halt there. National Highway 66 passes through the area, connecting it to Mumbai, Pune and Mangaluru.

Notable people

 Anjanibai Malpekar, classical singer
 Prabhakar Panshikar, theatre artist
 Bhumi Pednekar, Bollywood actress
 Kishori Pednekar, Mayor of Mumbai

References

External links

Cities and towns in North Goa district